Rah or Ra is a small coral islet of , located in the Banks group of northern Vanuatu. The same name also refers to the single village which is situated within this islet. There are massive rocks on the island.

The islet of Rah is situated off the larger island of Mota Lava. Access to Rah is done in two ways: at low tide, by wading across the narrow strait from the mainland; at high tide, by outrigger canoe.

Name 
The islet is known in English, and Bislama, as Rah  (where the letter h does not represent anything in the actual name). Rah reflects a shortened version of the form Rao , which is the way the islet is called in the neighbouring language Mota. The island has also been called Ara.

In the islanders' own language Mwotlap, the islet is called Aya  (with a locative prefix a-).

The name can be reconstructed, based on the Mota and Mwotlap forms, to Proto-Torres-Banks *Rao.

Population 
The 2009 census figures give a population of 189 inhabitants. A 2015 estimate puts the population of the island at 224 people, with 42 households.

References

Islands of Vanuatu
Torba Province